Composer Paul-Henri-Joseph Lebrun
(21 April 1863 – 4 November 1920)
was a Belgian composer and professor at the Ghent Conservatory, who won the Belgian Prix de Rome for music in 1891.

Life and work
Paul-Henri-Joseph Lebrun was born on April 21, 1863 in Ghent, Belgium. He studied as a pupil at the Ghent Conservatory.  In 1891, in his late twenties, he won the Belgian Prix de Rome for music, with his cantata Andromeda.  He also won first prize of the Belgian Academie, for a symphony.

In 1890, he had become a professor of music theory at the Ghent Conservatory and conductor of the "Orphéon" at Cambrai.  In 1895, Lebrun also became conductor of the "Cercle artistique" at Ghent.  He was an officer of the Legion of Honor.  Works include: the opera La Fiancée d'Abydos (Ghent, 1897), orchestral compositions, and choruses.  Paul-Henri-Joseph Lebrun died on November 4, 1920 in Louvain (Leuven, Belgium).

See also
 Pietro Mascagni (1863–1945), composer, contemporary of Lebrun.
 Xavier Leroux (1863–1919), composer, contemporary of Lebrun.
 Pierre-Auguste Renoir, painter, contemporary of Lebrun.

Notes

References
 Baker's Biographical Dictionary of Musicians (entry: "Lebrun, Paul-Henri-Joseph"), by Theodore Baker, Alfred Remy, p. 518, G. Schirmer, New York, Boston, 1919.

1863 births
1920 deaths
Belgian classical composers
Belgian male classical composers
Belgian opera composers
Male opera composers
Prix de Rome (Belgium) winners